Charles L. Cotton (born November 28, 1949) is an American attorney and gun rights advocate who has served as president of the National Rifle Association (NRA) since 2021. Cotton is also the moderator of TexasCHLForum.com, an online discussion forum about gun ownership.

Biography and education 
Cotton grew up in Houston, Texas. Cotton stated that "grew up hunting and plinking". He graduated with a Juris Doctor degree from the University of Houston in 1987.

National Rifle Association career 
Cotton was formerly a trustee of the NRA's Civil Rights Defense Fund. He chaired the NRA’s audit committee from 2017 onwards. Cotton was elected President of the NRA in 2021, succeeding Carolyn D. Meadows. He was reelected President on May 30, 2022.

TexasCHLForum.com 
Cotton is the moderator of TexasCHLForum.com, a gun rights forum. In 2016, he was reportedly criticized by open carry activists, who accused him of being insufficiently supportive of gun rights.

Charleston shooting comments 

In 2015, The Washington Post reported that Cotton, then an NRA board member, blamed slain pastor Clementa C. Pinckney for the deaths of nine churchgoers in a mass shooting in Charleston, which claimed Pinckney's own life. On an online discussion forum owned by Cotton, Cotton said that Pinckney, who was a member of the state senate, was to blame for having "voted against concealed-carry", and that "[i]nnocent people died because of his position on a political issue."

Cotton additionally argued that “Eight of [Pinckney's] church members who might be alive if he had expressly allowed members to carry handguns in church are dead.”

Civil War comments 
On a forum post, Cotton apparently lamented the loss of the Confederate States of America in the American Civil War, lamenting that it was “too bad we lost the civil war.” Cotton later posted that his view stemmed “purely from a states’ rights viewpoint and in light of the exponential growth of federal power after the war.”

Stoneman Douglas High School shooting comments 
On a forum post, Cotton criticized efforts to enact gun control measures in the aftermath of the Stoneman Douglas High School shooting, arguing that advocates were unfairly using “the sympathy factor of kids getting killed.” In a post, Cotton stated:“Wake up people and see what’s happening!!!! Bloomberg and Hollywood are pouring money into this effort and the media is helping to the fullest extent. We’ve never had this level of opposition before, not ever. It’s a campaign of lies and distortion, but it’s very well funded and they are playing on the sympathy factor of kids getting killed.”

Personal life 
He currently resides in Friendswood, Texas with his wife Martha.

References

Living people
Presidents of the National Rifle Association
American gun rights activists
1949 births

People from Houston
People from Friendswood, Texas
Texas lawyers